Ladies in Lavender is a 2004 British drama film written and directed by Charles Dance. The screenplay is based on a 1908 short story by William J. Locke. The film stars Judi Dench, Maggie Smith, Natascha McElhone, and Miriam Margolyes.

Plot
Ladies in Lavender is set in picturesque coastal Cornwall, in a tight-knit fishing village in 1936. A gifted young Polish violinist from Kraków, Andrea is sailing to America when he is swept overboard from his ship in a storm. When the Widdington sisters, Janet and Ursula, discover the handsome stranger washed up on the beach below their house, they nurse him back to health. However, the presence of the musically talented young man disrupts the peaceful lives of the sisters and the community in which they live.

Holidaying artist Olga Danilof, the sister of famed violinist Boris Danilof, becomes interested in Andrea after hearing him play the violin. Olga writes a letter to the sisters, telling them who she is and that she would like to introduce her brother to Andrea. Instead of giving him the letter, understanding her sister has feelings for Andrea, Janet burns it. As time progresses, Olga and Andrea grow closer, and one day Andrea angrily confronts the sisters about the letter. Andrea, realizing that Ursula has feelings for him, apologizes for getting angry and they reconcile.

Olga tells her brother of Andrea's talent, and he asks to meet Andrea in London. When Andrea meets with Olga to discuss the letter from her brother, she tells him that they must leave on a train immediately because her brother is only in London for 24 hours. Although Andrea cares deeply for the sisters, he knows this is his chance to start a career, and he leaves with Olga without saying goodbye. The sisters, worried that something has happened to him, call a friend of Andrea's who tells them he saw Andrea and Olga getting on a train. Thinking she'll never see him again, Ursula is heartbroken and Janet consoles her as best she can. Andrea later sends them a letter, along with a portrait of himself painted by Olga, thanking them for saving his life. The sisters travel to London to attend Andrea's first public performance in Britain, while the rest of the village listens in on the radio.

Cast

Production
The original story by William Locke was first published on 26 December 1908 in Collier's magazine, Vol.42, later appearing in book form in his short-story collection Faraway Stories (1916).

Ladies in Lavender was produced by Tale Partnerships and Scala Productions, with funding by Baker Street Media Finance, Paradigm Hyde Films, and the UK Film Council. Lakeshore Entertainment handled the rights to international distribution.
	
Filming took place in September and October 2003. Exteriors were filmed in Cadgwith, Helston, St. Ives and Prussia Cove in Cornwall. Interiors were filmed at the Pinewood Studios in Buckinghamshire.

The film marked the directorial debut of actor Charles Dance. Longtime friends Maggie Smith and Judi Dench were appearing together in a play in London's West End when Dance first approached them about the project. They immediately accepted his offer without even reading the script, they said in the film featurette Ladies In Lavender: A Fairy Tale. The film was the first English-language role for German actor Daniel Brühl.

Release
On November 8, 2004, Ladies in Lavender had its UK premiere as the 58th Royal Film Performance, an event held in aid of the Film & TV Charity. It was released nationwide in the United Kingdom on 12 November 2004. It made its North American debut at the Tribeca Film Festival on 23 April 2005. The film opened in limited release in the United States on 29 April 2005.

Prior to its release in the UK, the film screened at the Taormina Film Festival and the Toronto International Film Festival. It was released as Les Dames de Cornouailles in France, Der Duft von Lavendel in Germany, Lavendelflickorna in Sweden, and Parfum de lavande in French-speaking Canada. Ladies in Lavender was positively received by critics.

Critical response
In his review in The New York Times, critic Stephen Holden wrote: "[Dench and Smith] sink into their roles as comfortably as house cats burrowing into a down quilt on a windswept, rainy night... This amiably far-fetched film... heralds the return of the Comfy Movie (increasingly rare nowadays), the cinematic equivalent of a visit from a cherished but increasingly dithery maiden aunt. In this fading, sentimental genre peopled with grandes dames (usually English) making 'grande' pronouncements, the world revolves around tea, gardening and misty watercolor memories."

Roger Ebert of the Chicago Sun-Times called the film "perfectly sweet and civilized... It's a pleasure to watch Smith and Dench together; their acting is so natural it could be breathing."

In The Guardian, Peter Bradshaw observed that "despite a bit of shortbread-sugary emotion and an ending that fizzles out disappointingly, there's some nice period detail and decent lines in Charles Dance's directing debut," while Philip French of The Observer commented on the "beautiful setting, a succession of implausible incidents, and characteristically excellent work from Smith (all suppression and stoicism) and Dench (exuding unfulfilled yearning)."

Peter Keough of the Boston Phoenix said, "This exercise in scenery and music is as innocuous as a nosegay."

In the Chicago Tribune, Robert K. Elder awarded the film two out of a possible four stars and added: "[it] exemplifies that kind of polite, underdramatic Masterpiece Theatre staging that can either provide a surgical examination of English society or bore the pants off you. Ladies in Lavender does a bit of both... director Dance's momentum fades soon after Andrea's ankle mends, and we're left with a vague back story involving Andrea's intent to emigrate to America, though the mystery of how he ended up in Cornwall is never revisited nor revealed. [He] becomes sort of a blank character, a personality on whom we can impose our own curiosity and emotions... as compelling and original as this theme is, it's not enough to keep our attention, no matter how lovely the ladies in lavender are."

Box office
Ladies in Lavender grossed £2,604,852 in the UK and US$6,765,081 in North America (on limited release). Its total worldwide gross was $20,377,075.

Accolades
Both Judi Dench and Maggie Smith were nominated for Best European Actress at the European Film Awards. Dench was nominated for the ALFS Award for British Actress of the Year by the London Film Critics Circle.

Home media

Soundtrack

The film's original music was written by Nigel Hess and performed by Joshua Bell and the Royal Philharmonic Orchestra. Hess received a Classical BRIT Awards nomination for Best Soundtrack Composer.

The violin music played by Andrea, including compositions by Felix Mendelssohn, Niccolò Paganini, Jules Massenet, Claude Debussy, Pablo de Sarasate, and Johann Sebastian Bach, was also performed by Bell.

"Ladies in Lavender" (Joshua Bell) – 4:06  	
"Olga" (Joshua Bell) – 3:31 	
"Teaching Andrea" (Joshua Bell) – 2:53 	
"Fantasy for Violin and Orchestra" (Joshua Bell) – 3:40 	
"Méditation from Thaïs" by Jules Massenet (Joshua Bell) – 5:01 	
"Our Secret" (Joshua Bell) – 2:01 	
"On the Beach" (Royal Philharmonic Orchestra) – 2:33 	
"Introduction and Tarantella, Op. 43" by Pablo de Sarasate (Joshua Bell) –	5:16 	
"The Letter" (Joshua Bell) –	2:25 	
"Polish Dance – Zabawa Weselna" (Joshua Bell) – 2:41
"Stirrings" (Joshua Bell) – 1:50 	
"Potatoes" (Joshua Bell) – 1:49 	
"The Girl With Flaxen Hair" by Claude Debussy (Joshua Bell) – 2:33 	
"A Broken Heart" (Joshua Bell) – 3:33 	
"Two Sisters" 	(Royal Philharmonic Orchestra) – 2:22 	
"The Carnival of Venice" (Joshua Bell) – 9:20

References

Further reading

External links

 
 Ladies in Lavender at British Council–Film
 Ladies in Lavender at BBFC
 Ladies in Lavender at LUMIERE

2004 films
2004 directorial debut films
2004 drama films
2000s historical drama films
British historical drama films
Films about sisters
Films set in Cornwall
Films set in the 1930s
Films about violins and violinists
Films shot in England
Films directed by Charles Dance
Films produced by Elizabeth Karlsen
2000s English-language films
2000s British films
Films shot in Cornwall